Sérigné Faye (born 5 April 2004) is a Senegalese professional footballer who plays as a forward for Montpellier.

Club career
A youth product of the Senegalese academy KAF, Faye trialled with Montpellier in September 2022. On 12 November 2022, Faye signed with Montpellier on a 1.5 year contract. He was initially assigned to their reserves, before playing with their senior team in December 2022. He made his professional debut with Strasbourg in a 2–0 Ligue 1 win over AJ Auxerre on 29 January 2023, coming on as a late substitute.

References

External links
 
 

2004 births
Living people
Senegalese footballers
Association football forwards
RC Strasbourg Alsace players
Ligue 1 players
Championnat National 3 players
Senegalese expatriate footballers
Senegalese expatriates in France
Expatriate footballers in France